Camillo Achilli (21 August 1921 – 14 June 1998) was a professional Italian footballer who played for Internazionale and Genoa. After retiring as a player in 1953, Achilli enjoyed a career as a coach, managing sides such as Lecco, Internazionale and Palermo. His son was Marco Achilli, who also played for Inter.

References 

1921 births
1998 deaths
Footballers from Milan
Italian footballers
Italian football managers
Serie A managers
Serie A players
Serie B players
Inter Milan players
Genoa C.F.C. players
Calcio Lecco 1912 managers
Inter Milan managers
U.S. Alessandria Calcio 1912 managers
Palermo F.C. managers
Association football midfielders